Haesindang Park, also called Penis Park, is a park located on the east coast of South Korea, in a city called Samcheok,  about  south of Samcheok in Gangwon Province. The park is noted for its number of  phallic statues. The collection created by Korean artists is on display in the form of "hanging arrangements to three-meter tall trunks of wood", for  joy, spirituality and sexuality. A small Folk Museum titled "Village Folk Museum" has exhibits of art objects on the "sex iconography" over ages in different cultures, shamanic rituals and also the history of the Korean fishing community.

Legend
A tragic legend known as the "Legend of Auebawi and Haesindang" shrouds the statues of the park. According to the legend, a woman was once left by her man on a rock in the sea while he worked. The man was later unable to retrieve her because of a storm, and the woman drowned. After that, the village people were not able to catch fish. Some said that it was because of the dead woman. One day, a fisherman urinated into the water and afterward, he was able to catch fish, so it was thought that exposing the deceased virgin to male genitalia pleased her. To soothe her spirit further, the local village people made several phallic wooden carvings and held religious ceremonies on her behalf. After a while, the fish slowly returned and the villagers were able to live comfortably again. The place where the woman died was named Auebawi Rock and the building where the religious ceremony is held twice a year was named Haesindang. The ceremony is still honored today as a traditional folk event.

Exhibits
The location where the virgin girl died is called the Aebawi Rock and a biannual religious ceremony, a traditional folk event, also known as Haesindang, is conducted at a small building here. The seaward end of the park has a small shrine dedicated to the spirit of the virgin girl, and the park has a bronze statue about the legend. There are around 50 phallic statues exhibited in various sizes and styles; some have faces on them and are more animated in appearance and more colorful, but others are exact depictions of the human penis. Near the cliff top there is a Chinese zodiac of sculptures in an arch with each animal carved inside of life-size penises. Some of the sculptures are also in the form of park benches, drums, and there's even a moving cannon. These were created for an exhibition held at Samcheok during the former Penis Culture Festival. Middle-aged men and women throng the museum. There is also a phallic red lighthouse down on the dock. The park also houses Korea's largest aquarium theater and an arboretum.

See also
 Chao Mae Tuptim

References

External links 

 
* Pictures and the Story of Haesindang Park in Sinnam, South Korea

Parks in Gangwon Province, South Korea
Penis
Phallic monuments